"Queen of Mean" is a song by Sarah Jeffery in her role of Princess Audrey from the Descendants 3 film and its soundtrack. The song was released on August 2, 2019, along with the album. The song has reached No. 49 on the Billboard Hot 100 chart. The song has also peaked at No. 57 on the Canadian Hot 100, and No. 89 on the UK Singles Chart. The official CLOUDxCITY remix was released on October 13, 2019.

Commercial performance 
The song debuted at number 67 on the Billboard Hot 100 chart becoming Jeffery's first entry on the chart and one of the highest-charting songs from the Descendants franchise as well as the highest charting solo song from any of the films. In its second week, the song jumped to number forty nine on the chart becoming the second highest-charting song from any Descendants film behind “Rotten To The Core”. The song spent eight consecutive weeks on the Billboard Hot 100 becoming the longest charting Descendants song. The following week, it left the chart for the first time.

Music video 
The music video was released on Disney Music's Vevo channel on August 2, 2019 following the premiere of the film. Overnight, the music video achieved two million views, and later reached number one on YouTube's Trending videos list. It has since received over 270 million views. The video became the first from Descendants 3 to reach 100 million views and 200 million views and is the most viewed music video from the film as well as one of the most viewed from any of the films. It also has over two million likes becoming the franchise's most liked music video.

On September 27, 2019, Disney released a Memoji music video for the song.

Charts

Certifications

Track listing
Digital download
 "Queen of Mean" - 3:09

Remixes EP
 "Queen of Mean (CLOUDxCITY Remix) - 3:30
 "Queen of Mean/What's My Name CLOUDxCITY Mashup - 2:28

References 

2019 singles
2019 songs
Songs written by Tim James (musician)
Songs written by Antonina Armato
Songs from Descendants (franchise)